Waldo Manuel Mora Longa (born 12 December 1942) is a Chilean politician and journalist who served as member of the Chamber of Deputies of Chile and also as an Intendant of the Antofagasta Region.

References

External links
 BCN Profile

1942 births
Living people
University of Chile alumni
21st-century Chilean politicians
Christian Democratic Party (Chile) politicians